Jack Duncan may refer to:

Jack Duncan (rugby union) (1900–1969), Australian rugby union player
John Riley Duncan (1850–1911), known as Jack, Texas lawman
Jack Duncan (soccer) (born 1993), Australian football (soccer) goalkeeper

See also
Jack Duncan-Hughes (1882–1962), Australian politician
Walter Jack Duncan (1881–1941), American war artist
John Duncan (disambiguation)